Ahmad bin Mohd Don (born c. 1947) is a Malaysian banker and chartered accountant who served as the fifth  Governor of Bank Negara Malaysia, Malaysia's central bank, from 1993 to 1998.

Education 
Ahmad holds a Bsc. Econ. Honours Degree from the University of Wales, Aberystwyth, United Kingdom where he graduated summa cum laude in 1969. He is a fellow of the Institute of Chartered Accountants in England and Wales and a member of the Malaysian Institute of Chartered Public Accountants.

Career 
Ahmad started his career with the Corp of Accountants, Government of Malaysia between 1972 and 1973 before joining the private sector. He served as financial controller between 1973 and 1980 in companies such as Syarikat Jengka Sdn. Bhd., Mansfield Berhad and Pernas Securities Sdn. Bhd, where he was also the company secretary. In November 1980, he joined Permodalan Nasional Berhad as deputy general manager and was involved in planning and launching the National Unit Trust Scheme in 1981. Subsequently, in April 1983, he joined Malayan Banking Berhad as General Manager, Treasury. During his service with Malayan Banking Berhad, he was promoted to senior general manager and board member, then to executive director and in January 1991, he was appointed group managing director and chief executive officer, a position he held until 1993.

He served as the Governor of Bank Negara Malaysia, from May 1993 to August 1998. He replaced Jaffar Hussein, and was followed by Ali Abul Hassan Sulaiman.

He is currently a director of MAA Group Berhad (formerly known as MAA Holdings Berhad), Zurich Insurance Malaysia Berhad, KAF Investment Bank Berhad, Hap Seng Plantations Holdings Berhad and JP Morgan Chase Bank Berhad. He is not related to any director and/or major shareholder of United Malacca Berhad and has no personal interest in any business dealings involving the company. He has attended all five board meetings held during the financial year ended 30 April 2013.

Honours
 :
 Officer of the Order of the Defender of the Realm (KMN) (1990)
 Commander of the Order of Loyalty to the Crown of Malaysia (PSM) - Tan Sri (1997)
 :
 Companion I of the Exalted Order of Malacca (D.M.S.M.) - Datuk (1995)

References

 

Date of birth missing (living people)
20th-century Malaysian businesspeople
Officers of the Order of the Defender of the Realm
Governors of the Central Bank of Malaysia
Commanders of the Order of Loyalty to the Crown of Malaysia
Malaysian bankers
Malaysian Muslims
Malaysian people of Malay descent
Year of birth missing (living people)
Living people